Bagets is a 1984 two-part Filipino youth-oriented comedy film directed by Maryo J. de los Reyes under the production of Viva Films.

Plot 
The movie focuses on the lives of five young boys - boy next door Adie, "overstaying" Tonton, the geeky Gilbert, the martial arts buff Toffee, and rich guy Arnel - as they try to pass senior year in a different high school (they were kicked out from their previous school). Along the way, they encounter some of the typical adventures and misadventures common to adolescents - young love, family problems, and sexual hijinks.

However, all does not go well, as their separate backgrounds generate problems of their own. Arnel is the only son whose parents want to take over the family business and his mother disapproves of his choice of girlfriend, Janice, who comes from a middle-class background. Toffee seeks companionship in Christine, an older flight attendant, because his own mother, an actress, does not attend to his needs. Gilbert lives in a rented apartment where his mother is hard at work as a businesswoman and the father, a policeman, often hangs out at sauna baths when the rent is already months overdue. His situation is also the same as that of Tonton, who has stayed in senior year for four years. Adie's in love with Ivy, a girl next door who's actually married.

Reality hits the gang the hardest when Tonton loses his girlfriend, Rose, in a car accident while drag racing on the same night of the junior-senior prom. As graduation day draws near, it dawns on the gang that they will have to grow up to prepare for life after high school.

Cast 
 William Martinez as Tonton
 J.C. Bonnin as Toffee
 Herbert Bautista  as Gilbert
 Raymond Lauchengco as Arnel
 Aga Muhlach as Adie
 Jobelle Salvador as Melissa
 Eula Valdez as Janice
 Yayo Aguila as Rose
 Irma Alegre as Fe Alvarez
 Chanda Romero as Christine
 Herminio Bautista as Butch Bautista
 Baby Delgado as Ivy
 Bembol Roco as Buko Vendor
 Romeo Rivera as Arnel's father
 Robert Campos as Ivy's husband
 Rodolfo 'Boy' Garcia as Tonton's father
 Celia Rodriguez as Adie's mother
 Luz Valdez as Gilbert's mother
 Rosemarie Gil as Arnel's mother
 Liza Lorena as Toffee's mother

Bagets 2

Plot
Produced in the same year as Bagets, Bagets 2 is set in the immediate summer after the events of the first movie, and deals with more of the guys' misadventures as they prepare for college. The film most deals with their participation in an arts workshop and inter-personal relationships with three new characters - Wally, Gilbert's cousin and a young man forced by his mother to become a priest; Mikee, a TV director's son looking for his big break, and Ponce, an auto expert-cum-dancer. Also included in the mix is Ruth, Tonton & Toffee's balikbayan cousin.

Cast
Most of the cast from the original movie returned, including the actors who played the lead characters' parents. However, Aga Muhlach (Adie) and Jobelle Salvador (Melissa) did not reprise their roles. According to the Bagets DVD feature "Flashback: The BAGETS Reunion," Muhlach's career was already taking off at the time. Salvador's absence has not been explained. As a result, their circumstances were written in the story - Adie flew off to the United States at the start of the movie, while Melissa went to Davao to join her father.

William Martinez as Tonton
J.C. Bonnin as Toffee
Herbert Bautista as Gilbert
Raymond Lauchengco as Arnel
Ramon Christopher as Mikee
Cheska Iñigo as Ruth
Eula Valdez as Janice
Francis Magalona as Ponce aka Pawnshop
Jon Hernandez as Wally
Monette Rivera as Noreen Burgos
Claudette Khan as Emerie Tuazon
Grace Gonzales as Sarah Jane
Mariglen Ordonez as Glenda
Joy Maniego as Nicolette
Cherie Gil as Marinel

Bagets 3: The Reunion
In 2007, Bagets director Maryo J. de los Reyes revealed that Viva Films will be doing a Bagets reunion movie. The original cast of both Bagets films was supposed to star in this installment. The movie had a 2008 production start date.

However, Raymond Lauchengco, one of the original five lead actors, said the film will not be done at all because some members of the cast no longer had the appetite to see it through.

Remake

Bagets: Just Got Lucky is an afternoon youth-oriented television show in the Philippines that is produced by Viva Television and developed by TV5. It is a remake of the 1984 films Bagets and Bagets 2.

References

External links
 
 

1984 films
Philippine comedy films
Tagalog-language films
Films directed by Maryo J. de los Reyes